Shame on You may refer to:
"Shame on You", a condemning idiom used to scold.

Music
Shame on You (The Native Years), a 1989 compilation album by the Darling Buds
"Shame on You" (Cooley song), 1945
"Shame on You" (Indigo Girls song), 1997
"Shame on You" (Tomas Thordarson song), Danish entry in the Eurovision Song Contest 2004
"Shame on You (to Keep My Love from Me)", a 2007 song by Andrea Corr
"Shame on You", a song by Aerosmith from Done with Mirrors, 1985
"Shame on You", a song by the Darling Buds from Pop Said..., 1988
"Shame on You", a song by Hot Hot Heat from Elevator, 2005
"Shame on You", a song by Nik Kershaw from Human Racing, 1984
"Shame on You", a song by Skylar Grey from the 2019 EP Angel with TattoosPop Said...